Kyösti Tapio Virrankoski (born 4 April 1944 in Kauhava)
is a Finnish politician, member of the Finnish parliament and former
Member of the European Parliament (MEP) with the Centre Party of Finland,
part of the Alliance of Liberals and Democrats for Europe and sits on
the European Parliament's Committee on Agriculture and Rural Development
and its Committee on Budgetary Control and the Committee on Budgets.

Personal life
His parents were Väinö Antti Virrankoski (1906–69) and Impi Irja Ireene Virrankoski (Kleemola) (1906–92). He was the last of 5 children. His oldest brother, Antti Aimo Kullervo Virrankoski (1927–92) was the municipal chairman of Lapua. He is married and has 3 children.

Education
 1972: Bachelor's degree in philosophy from Helsinki University.

Career
 1968-1974: Teacher of mathematics and natural sciences
 1987-1991 and 1995-1996: lecturer in mathematics (1974–1983)
 political secretary to the Defence Minister
 1973-2000: Member of the Kauhava municipal and subsequently town council
 1977-1989: Member of the Kauhava municipal and subsequently town executive
 1990-1999: Chairman of the Kauhava town council
 1993-2000: Chairman of the Southern Bothnia Regional Council
 1991-1995: Member of Parliament
 1994-1995: Member of Finland's delegation to the Nordic Council
 1996-2009: Member of the European Parliament
 posts held at the European Parliament
 2004-2009: Member of the Temporary Committee on Policy Challenges and Budgetary Means of the Enlarged Union
 1996-1999: Member of the Delegation for Relations with the Mashreq countries
 1999-2001: Member of the Delegation for Relations with Estonia
 2001-2004: Member of the Delegation for Relations with Romania

See also
 2004 European Parliament election in Finland

References

External links
 
 

1944 births
Living people
People from Kauhava
Centre Party (Finland) MEPs
MEPs for Finland 1996–1999
MEPs for Finland 1999–2004
MEPs for Finland 2004–2009
Members of the Parliament of Finland (1991–95)